Viktor Ivanovich Grishin (in ; born February 17, 1951, Bolshebereznikovsky District, Mordovia, Soviet Union) is a Russian economist and politician, full Ph.D. in Economics, professor.

Early life 
In 1973, he graduated from the Tomsk Institute of Radioelectronics and Electronic Engineering. From 1973 to 1984 he worked as engineer at various industrial establishments in Tomsk and Saransk. From 1981 to 1984 he attended graduate school at the Research Institute of USSR Ministry of Construction.

Career 
From 1985 to 1988 he served as Deputy Chairman of the State Planning Committee of the Mordovian ASSR.

From 1989 to 1992 he served as Deputy Chairman of the State Committee of the Mordovian ASSR for Economics.

From 1992 - Deputy Minister, then Minister of Economics, from May 1996 he became Deputy Prime Minister - Minister of Economy of the Republic of Mordovia.

From 1999 to 2008 has been a member of the Russia's State Duma of the third, fourth and fifth convocations. He served as Chairman of the State Duma Committee on Federation Affairs and Regional Policy, member of the Energy Committee, Deputy Head of the United Russia fraction in the State Duma.

From 2008 to 2020 he served as Rector of Plekhanov Russian University of Economics.

In January 2006 he became full Ph.D. in Economics.

Honors and awards 
 Order of Honour (2003).
 Order "For Merit to the Fatherland", 4th class (2015).

Family 
Married with a son and a daughter, 7 grandchildren.

References

External links

 Viktor Grishin: “Graduates of Plekhanov University easily find work in the CIS countries” RIA Novosti 

1951 births
Living people
Russian economists
United Russia politicians
Recipients of the Order "For Merit to the Fatherland", 4th class
Recipients of the Order of Honour (Russia)
Third convocation members of the State Duma (Russian Federation)
Fourth convocation members of the State Duma (Russian Federation)
Fifth convocation members of the State Duma (Russian Federation)